Dendropsophus microps is a species of frog in the family Hylidae.
It is found in Brazil and possibly Argentina.
Its natural habitats are subtropical or tropical moist lowland forests, subtropical or tropical moist montane forests, subtropical or tropical moist shrubland, intermittent freshwater marshes, plantations, heavily degraded former forest, ponds, and canals and ditches.
It is threatened by habitat loss.

References

microps
Amphibians described in 1872
Taxa named by Wilhelm Peters
Taxonomy articles created by Polbot
Endemic fauna of Brazil
Amphibians of Brazil